Shh or Shhh or SHH can refer to:

Shh, a request for silence

People
Sshh Liguz (born 1984), stage name of Sharna Liguz, an Australian artist and singer and part of the music duo Sshh with Zak Starkey

Places
Shishmaref Airport, US airport in the state of Alaska
Sir Solomon Hochoy Highway, a freeway in Trinidad and Tobago
South Harrow tube station, England, London Underground station code

Arts and entertainment
Shinbi's Haunted House, an initial title for The Haunted House, a Tooniverse animated television series

Films
Sh-h-h-h-h-h, 1955 American cartoon directed by Tex Avery
Shhh (film), 1975 American comedy film starring Rita Moreno
Shhh! (film), 1993 Indian horror film starring Sadhu Kokila

Literature
Shhhhh! Everybody's Sleeping, children's book by Julie Markes
"Sshhh ...", science fiction short story by David Brin

Music

Albums
Shhh! (EP) Flying Lotus
Shhh (Chumbawamba album), album by anarchist punk band Chumbawamba
Shhh! (Kumbia Kings album), 2001 album by A.B. Quintanilla and Kumbia Kings
Shhh...Don't Tell, comedy album by Adam Sandler
Shh. Just Go with It, album by Every Avenue

Songs
"Shh" (After School song), 2014
"Shhh", a song by Bhad Bhabie from 15
"Shhh", a song by Prince from The Gold Experience
"Shhh/Peaceful", song by Miles Davis from album In a Silent Way
"Shhh!", a song by Koda Kumi from W Face: Inside/Outside
"Secret (Shh)", song by Charli XCX from EP Vroom Vroom

Other uses
SHH, sonic hedgehog gene name
Shoshoni language, ISO 639-3 alpha-3 code
Students Helping Honduras, an international non-governmental organization operating in the U.S. and Honduras

See also

 
 SSH (disambiguation)
 SH (disambiguation)